Manuel Frederico Tojal de Valsassina Heitor (born 1958) is a Portuguese politician who served as Minister of Science, Technology and Higher Education  until 30 March 2022 when he was succeeded by Elvira Fortunato. Heitor graduated with a PhD in mechanical engineering from Imperial College London, and did a post-doctoral at the University of California, San Diego. From March 2005 to June 2011, Heitor served as the Secretary of State for Science, Technology and Higher Education.

References

1958 births
21st-century Portuguese politicians

Government ministers of Portugal
Living people
People from Lisbon
Portuguese people of Italian descent